Soul Mates may refer to:
 Soul Mates (TV series), a 2014 Australian television comedy series
 Soulmates (TV series), a 2020 American television anthology series
 "Soul Mates" (Babylon 5), a 1994 episode of television series Babylon 5
 Soul Mates (album), a jazz album by saxophonists Charlie Rouse and Sahib Shihab
 "The Soul Mate", a 1996 episode of television series Seinfeld
 Soul Mate #9, a 2001 song by Tina Arena
 Soul Mates (film), a 1925 silent drama
 Soul Mates, a 1913 film directed by Gilbert P. Hamilton
 Soul Mates, a song by Grant Nicholas on Yorktown Heights

See also
 Soulmate (disambiguation)